PM, sometimes referred to as the PM programme to avoid ambiguity, is BBC Radio 4's long-running early evening news and current affairs programme. It is currently presented by Evan Davis and produced by BBC News.

Broadcast times
PM is broadcast from 5pm to 6pm from Monday to Friday and from 5pm to 5:30pm on Saturdays. On weekdays it is followed by another news programme, the Six O'Clock News. The final five minutes of the weekday edition are only broadcast on FM as long wave breaks away from the programme at 5.54pm to broadcast the teatime shipping forecast.

History
PM launched on 6 April 1970, with its first presenters, William Hardcastle and Derek Cooper, promising a programme that "sums up the day, and your evening starts here". Radio 4’s 10pm news programme The World Tonight was launched on the same day.

PM made history for being the first radio news programme to feature its own theme tune. Three have been used, with the last ending in 1997 in the aftermath of the death of Princess Diana. The first PM theme tune was by John Baker and the BBC Radiophonic Workshop. The second was produced by Dudley Simpson, with the final one, used between 1993 and 1997, by George Fenton. 

Notable presenters after William Hardcastle included Steve Race, Brian Widlake, Robert Williams, Chris Lowe, Joan Bakewell, Susannah Simons, Rachael Heyhoe Flint and Valerie Singleton (a former Blue Peter presenter — in pre-interview chats, junior ministers "inevitably" claimed that they still had their Blue Peter badge).

During the late 1970s and early 1980s, the programme's main presenter was Gordon Clough, who would typically prepare for the programme by completing the Times, Guardian and FT crosswords.

Valerie Singleton and Hugh Sykes co-presented the show during the 1980s but had a difficult relationship. Singleton made a one-off return to PM on 29 February 2016 to co-present a special 'Leap Day' programme, alongside Eddie Mair, and proposed marriage to him at the end of the programme.

On 12 April 1998, a Saturday edition of the programme was launched.

Presenters

iPM
On 12 October 2007, the programme started an additional blog for a spin-off programme called iPM, broadcast on Saturdays at 5:30pm (immediately after the Saturday edition of PM) until 22 December and available as a podcast. 'Through the blog, iPM listeners could discuss ideas with the production team and comment on the stories being lined up for the following show – so what ended up on air was shaped by the listeners.

Quirky features
Though predominantly consisting of serious news, the programme is known for occasional satirical commentary, both from the presenters and in letters from listeners.

In 2008 the programme renamed its financial news slot "Upshares, Downshares" and used the title music of the television drama Upstairs, Downstairs, composed by Alexander Faris. In 2009, variations on the tune performed by PM listeners in a variety of styles from bossa nova to heavy metal became a regular feature. This ended when the UK statistically left recession early in 2010. In October 2010, a compilation was released in aid of the Children in Need charity appeal, for which it raised over £70,000.

Production
PM is currently edited by Owenna Griffiths. The production team also works on Radio 4's The World at One, The World This Weekend and Broadcasting House.

A Radio Times poll in 2005 named Mair as the fifth most powerful person in radio.

Awards
The programme won two accolades in the 2007 Sony Radio Academy Awards: Gold in the Interactive Programme Award, and Silver for Speech Programme.

See also
 The Today programme, Radio 4's early morning stablemate to PM.
 The World at One, Radio 4's afternoon stablemate to  PM.
 The World Tonight, Radio 4's late-evening stablemate to PM.
Analogous programmes include PM on ABC Radio National in Australia and All Things Considered on NPR in the United States.

References

External links

Video clips
 Upshares Downshares in the studio
 Upshares Downshares (electronic guitar arrangement)
 TV advert

Audio clips
 Upshares Downshares (Dr Who Radiophonic Workshop arrangement)
 PM theme tunes

BBC Radio 4 programmes
1970 radio programme debuts
BBC news radio programmes